Gorodishche is a rural locality (a selo) and the administrative center of Gorodishchensky Selsoviet, Starooskolsky District, Belgorod Oblast, Russia. The population was 3,562 as of 2010. There are 46 streets.

Geography 
Gorodishche is located 31 km southeast of Stary Oskol (the district's administrative centre) by road. Soldatskoye is the nearest rural locality.

References 

Rural localities in Starooskolsky District